Dickkopf-related protein 3 is a protein in the Dickkopf family that in humans is encoded by the DKK3 gene.

This gene encodes a protein that is a member of the dickkopf family. The secreted protein contains two cysteine rich regions and is involved in embryonic development through its interactions with the Wnt signaling pathway. The expression of this gene is decreased in a variety of cancer cell lines and it may function as a tumor suppressor gene. Alternative splicing results in multiple transcript variants encoding the same protein.

References

Further reading